Philip John Schuyler (November 18, 1804) was an American general in the Revolutionary War and a United States Senator from New York. He is usually known as Philip Schuyler, while his son is usually known as Philip J. Schuyler.

Born in Albany, Province of New York, into the prosperous Schuyler family, Schuyler fought in the French and Indian War. He won election to the New York General Assembly in 1768 and to the Continental Congress in 1775. He planned the Continental Army's 1775 Invasion of Quebec, but poor health forced him to delegate command of the invasion to Richard Montgomery. He prepared the Continental Army's defense of the 1777 Saratoga campaign, but was replaced by Major General Horatio Gates as the commander of Continental forces in the theater. Schuyler resigned from the Continental Army in 1779.

Schuyler served in the New York State Senate for most of the 1780s and supported the ratification of the United States Constitution. He represented New York in the 1st United States Congress but lost his state's 1791 Senate election to Aaron Burr. After a period in the state senate, he won election to the United States Senate again in 1797, affiliating with the Federalist Party. He resigned due to poor health the following year. He was the father of Elizabeth Schuyler Hamilton and the father-in-law of Secretary of the Treasury Alexander Hamilton.

Early life
His maternal grandfather was Stephanus Van Cortlandt, the 17th Mayor of New York City.

Before his father died on the eve of his eighth birthday, Schuyler attended the public school in Albany. Afterward, he was educated by tutors at the Van Cortlandt family estate at New Rochelle. Fluent in both Dutch and English from childhood, in 1748 he began to study with Reverend Peter Strouppe at the New Rochelle French Protestant Church, where he learned French and mathematics. While he was at New Rochelle he also joined numerous trade expeditions where he met Iroquois leaders and learned to speak Mohawk.

Schuyler joined the British forces in 1755 during the French and Indian War, raised a provincial company, and was commissioned as its captain by his cousin, Lieutenant Governor James Delancey. In 1756, he accompanied British officer Colonel John Bradstreet to Oswego, where he gained experience as a quartermaster, which ended when the outpost fell to the French. Schuyler took part in the battles of Lake George, Oswego River, Carillon and Fort Frontenac.

After the war, Bradstreet sent Schuyler to England to settle Bradstreet's reimbursement claims for expenses he incurred during the war effort, and he remained in England from 1760 to 1763. After returning to the United States he took over management of several farms and business enterprises in upstate New York, including a lumber venture in Saratoga. In addition, Schuyler was responsible for constructing the first flax mill in the American colonies. Schulyer became colonel and commander of a militia district regiment in 1767. In 1768, he served as a member of the New York Assembly.

American Revolution
Schuyler was elected to the Continental Congress in 1775, and served until he was appointed a major general of the Continental Army in June. General Schuyler took command of the Northern Department, and planned the Invasion of Quebec. His poor health required him to place Richard Montgomery in command of the invasion. In 1777, he again served in the Continental Congress.

Saratoga campaign 
After returning to command of the Northern Department in 1777, Schuyler was active in preparing a defense against the Saratoga Campaign, part of the "Three Pronged Attack" strategy of the British to cut the American Colonies in two by invading and occupying New York State. In the summer of 1777, John Burgoyne marched his British force south from Quebec and through the valleys of Lakes Champlain and George. On the way he invested the small Colonial garrison occupying Fort Ticonderoga at the nexus of the two lakes. When General St. Clair abandoned Fort Ticonderoga in July, the Congress replaced Schuyler with General Horatio Gates, who had accused Schuyler of dereliction of duty. In 1778, Schuyler and Arthur St. Clair faced a court of inquiry over the loss of Ticonderoga, and both were acquitted.

The British offensive was eventually stopped by Continental Army then under the command of Gates and Benedict Arnold in the Battles of Saratoga. That victory, the first wholesale defeat of a large British force, marked a turning point in the revolution, for it convinced France to enter the war on the American side. When Schuyler demanded a court martial to answer Gates' charges, he was vindicated but resigned from the Army on April 19, 1779. He then served in two more sessions of the Continental Congress in 1779 and 1780.

Later career
As a prominent politician and Patriot leader in New York, Schuyler was the subject of an unsuccessful kidnapping attempt, which was plotted and led by John Walden Meyers on August 7, 1781. Schuyler was able to vacate his Albany mansion before the kidnappers arrived. Schuyler was an original member of the New York Society of the Cincinnati.

After the war, he expanded his Saratoga estate to tens of thousands of acres, adding slaves, tenant farmers, a store, mills for flour, flax, and lumber. He built several schooners on the Hudson River, and named the first Saratoga. According to the Schuyler Mansion Historic Society, there were around 40 slaves between the Albany and Saratoga estates.

He was a member of the New York State Senate from 1780 to 1784, and at the same time New York State Surveyor General from 1781 to 1784. Afterwards he returned to the State Senate from 1786 to 1790, where he actively supported the adoption of the United States Constitution.

In 1789, he was elected a U.S. Senator from New York to the First United States Congress, serving from July 27, 1789, to March 3, 1791. After losing his bid for re-election in 1791 to Aaron Burr, he returned to the State Senate from 1792 to 1797. In 1797, he was selected again to the U.S. Senate and served in the 5th United States Congress from March 4, 1797, until his resignation because of ill health on January 3, 1798.

Personal life

According to the Schuyler Family's Bible, on September 7, 1755, he married Catherine Van Rensselaer (1734–1803) at Albany. In the Bible entry, he was called “Philip Johannes Schuyler” and she was called “Catherina Van Rensselaer”.  She was the daughter of Johannes Van Rensselaer (1707/08–1783) and his first wife, Engeltje Livingston (1698–1746/47). Johannes was the grandson of Hendrick van Rensselaer (1667–1740). Engeltje was the daughter of Robert Livingston the Younger. Philip and Catherine had 15 children together, eight of whom survived to adulthood, including:

 Angelica Schuyler (1756–1814), who married John Barker Church (1748–1818), later a British MP.
 Elizabeth Schuyler (1757–1854), who married Alexander Hamilton (1755/7–1804), later the first United States Secretary of the Treasury. Elizabeth co-founded the first private orphanage in New York City. 
 Margarita "Peggy" Schuyler (1758–1801), who married Stephen Van Rensselaer III (1764–1839), 8th Patroon. 
 Cornelia Schuyler (1761–1762), a twin to the first John Bradstreet.
 John Bradstreet Schuyler (1761–1761), a twin to Cornelia.
 John Bradstreet Schuyler (1763–1764).
 John Bradstreet Schuyler (1765–1795), who married Elizabeth Van Rensselaer (1768–1841), the sister of Stephen Van Rensselaer III who married his sister Peggy. 
 Philip Jeremiah Schuyler (1768–1835), who served in the U.S. House of Representatives and who married Sarah Rutsen; after her death in 1805, he married Mary Anna Sawyer.
 Triplets (1770–1770, Unbaptized).
 Rensselaer Schuyler (1773–1847), who married Elizabeth Ten Broeck, daughter of General Abraham Ten Broeck.
 Cornelia Schuyler (1776–1808), who married Washington Morton.
 Cortlandt Schuyler (1778–1778).
 Catherine Van Rensselaer Schuyler (1781–1857), who married first, Samuel Malcolm (son of William Malcolm), and then James Cochran (1769–1848), her cousin and the son of John Cochran and Gertrude Schuyler, Philip Schuyler's sister.

Schuyler's country home had been destroyed by General John Burgoyne's forces in October 1777. Later that year, he began rebuilding on the same site, now located in southern Schuylerville, New York. This later home is maintained by the National Park Service as part of the Saratoga National Historical Park, and is open to the public.

Schuyler died at the Schuyler Mansion in Albany on November 18, 1804, four months after his son-in-law, Alexander Hamilton, was killed in a duel and 2 days before his 71st birthday. He is buried at Albany Rural Cemetery in Menands, New York.

Legacy

Place names 
Geographic locations and buildings named in Schuyler's honor include:
 Schuyler, New York
 Schuylerville, New York
 Schuyler County, New York, as well as Schuyler County, Illinois, and Schuyler County, Missouri
 Fort Schuyler, a military fortification begun in 1833 at the tip of Throggs Neck in the Bronx, which now houses the Maritime Industry Museum and the State University of New York Maritime College
 The Philip Schuyler Achievement Academy (named for Schuyler and his son Philip) in Albany, New York (name change expected in 2021)

Works of art 
Schuyler was depicted by John Trumbull in his 1821 painting Surrender of General Burgoyne, which hangs in the United States Capitol rotunda in Washington, D.C.

Major General Philip Schuyler, a bronze statue by sculptor J. Massey Rhind, was erected outside Albany City Hall in 1925. In June 2020, Albany mayor Kathy Sheehan signed an executive order for the statue to be removed and given to a "museum or other institution for future display with appropriate historical context", due to Schuyler's ownership of slaves. The statue was requested the next day by the mayor of Schuylerville, New York, who suggested that it be relocated to Schuyler House.

In popular culture 
The non-speaking role of Philip Schuyler was originated by ensemble member Sydney James Harcourt in the 2015 Broadway musical Hamilton, in which Schuyler's son-in-law Alexander Hamilton is the title character.

References

Citations

Further reading
 
 Revolutionary Enigma: A Re-Appraisal of General Philip Schuyler of New York by Martin H. Bush; 1969;.
 
 Proud Patriot: Philip Schuyler and the War of Independence, 1775–1783 by Don Gerlach; 1987; Syracuse University Press;.
 The New York Civil List compiled by Franklin Benjamin Hough (pages 37f; Weed, Parsons and Co., 1858)
 The Real George Washington by the National Center for Constitutional Studies; 1991; 2009 reprint 
 McEneny Ingraham, Courtland D., "Philip Schuyler", Mount Vernon Digital Encyclopedia of George Washington, https://www.mountvernon.org/library/digitalhistory/digital-encyclopedia/article/philip-john-schuyler-1733-1804/

External links

 Co-Planner of the Sullivan-Clinton Campaign Against the Iroquois
 Collection of Letters from Philip Schuyler
 Philip Schuyler Achievement Academy
 Finding Aid to Schuyler Family Collection, 1679–1823 at the New York State Library

1733 births
1804 deaths
Politicians from Albany, New York
People of the Province of New York
Schuyler family
American people of Dutch descent
Reformed Church in America members
Continental Congressmen from New York (state)
Pro-Administration Party United States senators from New York (state)
Federalist Party United States senators from New York (state)
New York (state) Federalists
Members of the New York General Assembly
Members of the New York Provincial Assembly
Members of the New York State Assembly
New York (state) state senators
New York State Engineers and Surveyors
American slave owners
Politicians from New Rochelle, New York
Military personnel from Albany, New York
Military personnel from New Rochelle, New York
People of New York in the French and Indian War
Continental Army officers from New York (state)
Continental Army personnel who were court-martialed
Continental Army generals
Burials at Albany Rural Cemetery
18th-century American politicians
United States senators who owned slaves